Pseudo Interactive was a video game developer based in Toronto, Ontario, Canada and started in 1995 by David Wu, Rich Hilmer, and Daniel Posner. In 2006, the company had over fifty employees. After closing, several employees formed DrinkBox Studios. Pseudo Interactive was later revived, in 2021.

History
They released a launch title for the Xbox called Cel Damage, which also released on the GameCube and PlayStation 2. They made Full Auto for Xbox 360. Their final game was Full Auto 2: Battlelines, released for the PlayStation 3.

As of April 6, 2008, it was announced that the company was shutting down. They were working on Crude Awakening for Eidos Interactive which was cancelled, leaving the company without the means to survive until securing another deal. It was widely believed to be an updated version of Carmageddon.

As of 2021, the company is developing an MMORTS, Conquest and Virtue

On October 7, 2022, Pseudo Interactive co-founder David Wu died of diabetic shock at the age of 47. By the time of his death, David Wu was lead developer at Pseudo Interactive which was revived in 2021

Video games
 2001 – Cel Damage (Xbox, GameCube)
 2002 – Cel Damage Overdrive (PlayStation 2)
 2004 – Crash (demos for Microsoft XNA)
 2006 – Full Auto (Xbox 360)
 2006 – Full Auto 2: Battlelines (PlayStation 3)
At least four games were in development at Pseudo before the studio closure:
 Crude Awakening
 Prodigal
 Divided City
 Cel Damage 2

References

External links
 
 Pseudo Interactive details at GameSpot
 Cancelled Pseudo Interactive Games at Unseen 64
 Kotaku report on Studio shutdown
 Full Auto Developer Shuts Down

Canadian companies established in 1995
Canadian companies disestablished in 2008
Companies based in Toronto
Video game companies established in 1995
Video game companies disestablished in 2008
Defunct video game companies of Canada
Defunct companies of Ontario
Video game development companies